Vytor: The Starfire Champion is a 1989 American animated television miniseries produced by World Events Productions. The show aired five episodes.

Armed with the magic shield, Vytor, along with the beautiful Skyla and his friends, battle Myzor Sarcophogus for the Starfire Ring and try to recover the Saturn Orb.

Cast

Allison Argo as Baboose
Peter Cullen as Myzor / Chief Eldor
Pat Fraley as Windchaser / Air Mutoid Warrior / Land Mutoid Warrior
Liz Georges as Skyla / Lyria
Michael Horton as	Vytor
Neil Ross as Targil

Due to the amount of money used to make the episodes, which were a combination of computer graphics and normal cell animation, and since Vytor did not have a toy deal, only a few episodes were made, and the series was only seen in a few select markets.

Episode list
 The Starfire Legacy
 Aerion
 The Spirit Tree
 Wilderland

DVD
World Events Productions released all the episodes in a 2 disc DVD in 2006 with the individual episodes and a version of them edited together into a feature.

References

External links
 
World Events Productions

1989 American television series debuts
1989 American television series endings
American children's animated science fiction television series
1980s American animated television series
English-language television shows